Arrowbear Lake is an unincorporated community in San Bernardino County, California, United States. Its altitude is 6,086 feet (1,855 m), in the San Bernardino Mountains.

The community of Arrowbear Lake is located east of Running Springs along Highway 18 in the San Bernardino National Forest, a mountain community with a population of 736.

The town gets its name from the fact that it lies halfway between Lake Arrowhead and Big Bear.

References

San Bernardino Mountains
Unincorporated communities in San Bernardino County, California
Unincorporated communities in California